Dunbar is an unincorporated community in Marlboro County, South Carolina, United States.

Geography
Dunbar is located at latitude 35.534 and longitude –79.561. The elevation is 131 feet.

References

External links

Unincorporated communities in Marlboro County, South Carolina
Unincorporated communities in South Carolina